Nasreen Mohamedi (1937—1990) was an Indian artist best known for her line-based drawings, and is today considered one of the most essential modern artists from India. Despite being relatively unknown outside of her native country during her lifetime, Mohamedi's work has been the subject of remarkable revitalisation in international critical circles and has received popular acclaim over the last decade. Her work has been exhibited at the Museum of Modern Art (MoMA) in New York, the Kiran Nadar Museum of Art in New Delhi, documenta in Kassel, Germany, and at Talwar Gallery, which organised the first solo exhibition of her work outside of India in 2003, Today, Mohamedi is considered one of the major figures of the art of the twentieth century.

Life and career 

Born in 1937 in Karachi, India, in what became western Pakistan some ten years after her birth, Mohamedi lived, even from her early years, a cosmopolitan life. She was born into the elite Tyabji family, a Suleymani Bohra family She was one of eight children. Her mother died when she was very young. Her father owned a photographic equipment shop in Bahrain, among other business ventures. Her family moved to Mumbai in 1944, and later Mohamedi attended St. Martin's School of the Arts, in London, from 1954 to 1957. After living briefly with her family in Bahrain, Mohamedi studied on a scholarship in Paris from 1961 to 1963, where she also worked at a printmaking atelier, and on her return to India, joined the Bhulabhai Institute for the Arts in Mumbai. Here she met other artists working at the time, including V.S. Gaitonde, M.F. Husain and Tyeb Mehta. Sometime after she joined the Bhulabhai Institute, her first solo exhibition was hosted at Gallery 59. It was in Mumbai where she met abstractionist Jeram Patel, who went on to become her friend and colleague, while Gaitonde served as her mentor.

She settled in Baroda in 1972, where she taught Fine Art at Maharaja Sayajirao University, and would continue teaching until her death in 1990. She also travelled abroad extensively, spending time in Kuwait, Bahrain, Japan, the United States of America, Turkey, and Iran over the course of her life.  Travel provided an essential source of inspiration for Mohamedi, who photographed and kept diaries throughout her life. Not only was she influenced by the deserts, Islamic architecture, and Zen aesthetics that she was exposed to during her travels, but, as Susette Min notes, "Mohamedi was deeply and intensely aware, as indicated in her photographs and journal entries, of herself and her body moving in time." During the last decade of her life, Mohamedi’s motor functions gradually deteriorated as she was challenged with a rare neurological disorder similar to Parkinson's disease, called Huntington's Chorea; she was able, however, to retain control of her drawing hand, and continued to create the precise, meticulous work she became known for, until her death at age 53.

Influences 

In the west Mohamedi is most often associated with Agnes Martin, with whom she was paired at the 2007 documenta in Kassel, Germany. Although Mohamedi's disciplined mark-making and frequent use of grids and lines does recall Martin's work, however, Mohamedi herself was not aware of the American artist and her paintings until late in her life.

It is known that Mohamedi knew and communicated with many of the leading artists in India in the 1960s and 1970s; V.S. Gaitonde, the great Indian abstract artist of the 20th century, as well as Tyeb Mehta, a renowned painter and part of the noted Bombay Progressive Artists' Group, became her mentors in the 1960s. Despite her interaction with such figures, as well as her immediate proximity to artists like M.F. Husain, Bhupen Khakhar, Ghulam Mohammed Sheikh, and Arpita Singh, Mohamedi created her own distinctive style; working at a time when the tendency was toward figurative or representational work, Mohamedi persisted in her pursuit of a personal vocabulary through which she saw the world.

In her diaries, Mohamedi makes reference to Kasimir Malevich and Wassily Kandinsky, both of whom she admired and claimed as influences on her work. Indeed, Constructivism and Suprematism are often used in approaching her work, which seems to share not only a geometric language, but also follows a similar urge to distill a systematic formal order from nature. The lyricism of Mohamedi’s work, the counterpoint to its precision and meticulousness, seems to have been influenced by the poetic and spiritual aspects of Paul Klee and Wassily Kandinsky; in 1970, at what Kapur names as a critical point in her career, Mohamedi wrote in her diary, "Again I am reassured by Kandinsky – the need to take from an outer environment and bring it an inner necessity."

Comparisons to Mohamedi's contemporaries are also frequent among reviews of her work; she is often associated with the American minimalism of the 1960s and 1970s and likened to artists such as Carl Andre, Ad Reinhardt, Barnett Newman, Mark Rothko, Richard Tuttle, and John Cage. Although not as closely related to her work formally, Eva Hesse has also provided an illuminating comparative example to Mohamedi, especially in the charisma and sensitivity she exhibited as a teacher and mentor.

Mohamedi's extensive travel also had great influence on the direction of her work. Not only was she able to gain exposure to Western artists and movements through her visits and study in Europe and in the United States, but she also became fascinated by Eastern traditions in her extensive travel in Asia. The distinctly emotive aspect of her work has been cited as the influence of the lyricism of Sufi, while her combination of geometry and Arabesque line is often traced to an exposure to Islamic design, especially the architecture of Iran, Turkey, and Rajasthan. Mohamedi’s work also evidences the influence of Zen Buddhism, which she embraced spiritually, particularly its rhythmic counterpoint of positive and negative spaces. The time she spent in the desert regions of Bahrain and Kuwait have been cited as sources of some of the spare geometry of Mohamedi's work. It is also known that Mohamedi was interested in weaving – a number of her photographs feature looms and textile machinery – an interest that appears in the patterned texture and intersecting lines of her gridded work.

Work 

Mohamedi's work defies categorisation; the result of a disciplined and sustained effort to craft an individual formal vocabulary, it remains without parallel, the product and artefact of Mohamedi's distinctive personality, process, and aesthetic values. In some of her early work, one can see attempts to capture the human form. She explored various mediums such as sketches, canvas based watercolour and oils to pencil and graphite. Her preferred medium of work was pencil and paper. She drew delicate but deliberate lines. She experimented with grid like formations and varying gradations at acute angles. What stood out in her works was her perception of light and shade. Although it is often difficult to temporally locate her work – she often left pieces untitled and undated – many critics have segmented her oeuvre into three general periods: an early period of sketches and semi-representational collage in the 1950s to mid-1960s, a "classic" period of increasingly non-representational forms, including her signature grid-based drawings, and a mature style in pen and ink.
Although her work, especially the mature drawings of the 1970s and 1980s, is disciplined, even austere, it remains highly rhythmic – releasing the energy and movement of natural phenomena through line. The grid that so often provides a spatial environment for her drawings is less a limitation than a framework for her compositions, allowing, in the words of Deepak Talwar, the “poetry within structure” to emerge.

Photography 

Beginning in the 1950s and early 1960s, Mohamedi began photographing her surrounding environment – not only during her frequent travels, but in the course of her daily life. Her photographs were more than documentary however; photos from the 1980s, for example, like her late work in pen and ink, are abstracted to the point of becoming non-representational.  Her friend and art historian Geeta Kapur has placed Mohamedi's photographs between the artistic and the real, stating that they create "an allegory of (dis)placement between the subject and the object." Although her photographs were never exhibited during her lifetime, they were subject to an artistic process as rigorous as the one Mohamedi used in executing her drawings.

The photographs, although neither preparations for her drawings nor works incomplete in themselves, help to illuminate the principles that inform all of Mohamedi's work; as Gregory Galligan notes, "Mohamedi's is…a roaming, cursive, meandering consciousness, which lights effortlessly upon fragments in a landscape, the cityscape and Islamic architectural forms, such as the stepped cornice of an early mosque observed in extreme close-up…Spare, nearly weightless and almost entirely self-effacing, Mohamedi's aesthetic is ultimately about focusing consciousness back onto itself with the aid of an abstract foil."
The first exhibition of Mohamedi’s photowork outside of India was in 2003, at Talwar Gallery in New York. Her photography was based on themes such as desert landscapes, seascapes, weaving patterns, the architecture of Fatehpur Sikri, and modern structures.

Solo exhibitions 
 2020Talwar Gallery, Pull with a Direction, New York, NY, US
2016 
The Metropolitan Museum of Art, Nasreen Mohamedi, @ MET Breuer, New York, NY, US
 2015 Museo Nacional Centro de Arte Reina Sofia, Nasreen Mohamedi, Madrid, Spain
 2014 Tate, Nasreen Mohamedi, Liverpool, UK
 2013 Talwar Gallery, Becoming One, New York, NY, US
 Kiran Nadar Museum of Art, Nasreen Mohamedi: A Retrospective, New Delhi, India
 2010  Kunsthalle Basel, Nasreen Mohamedi, Basel, Switzerland
 2009  Milton Keynes Gallery, Nasreen Mohamedi, Milton Keynes, UK:Office for Contemporary Art Norway, Nasreen Mohamedi: Notes -- Reflections on INdian Modernism Part 1), Oslo Norway
 2008 Talwar Gallery, the grid, unplugged, New York, NY, US
 2005 Drawing Center, Lines among Lines, New York, NY, US
 2003 Talwar Gallery, Photoworks, New York, NY, US
 1991  Jehangir Art Gallery, Nasreen in Retrospect, Bombay, India
 1961  Gallery 59, Bombay, India

Publications 
2005: Nasreen Mohamedi: Lines among Lines, New York: The Drawing Center.

2008: On Line: Drawing Through the Twentieth Century, New York: Museum of Modern Art.

2009: The grid, unplugged: Nasreen Mohamedi, New York: Talwar Gallery.

References

External links 
 The MET, Of Calligraphic Lines and Radiant Light: Nasreen Mohamedi and Islamic Aesthetics, June 2016.
 Art in America, Philippe Vergne on Nasreen Mohamedi, August 2015.
 The New York Times, William Kentridge on Nasreen Mohamedi, 11 October 2013.
 Financial Times, Nasreen Mohamedi: A View to Infinity, 8 February 2013.
 NDTV, Remembering Nasreen Mohamedi, 3 February 2013.
 Mint, The line of control, 1 February 2013.
 The New York Times, Squiggly, Tangly and Angular, 1 December 2010.
 Guardian, Exhibition Preview: Nasreen Mohamedi, Milton Keynes, September 2009.
 Frieze, Nasreen Mohamedi, November–December 2009.
 Art in America, Nasreen Mohamedi, March 2009.
 The Brooklyn Rail, Nasreen Mohamedi:The grid, unplugged, December 2008/January 2009.
 The New York Times, Nasreen Mohamedi, 31 October 2008.
 The Hindu, Between the Lines, 19 October 2008.
 Metropolis M, Moderate Modernism: On Tagore, Le Corbusier and Nasreen Mohamedi, December 2007.
 The New York Times, Lines Among Lines, 13 May 2005.
 Artcritical.com, Nasreen Mohamedi, December 2003.
 The New York Times, Nasreen Mohamedi, 10 October 2003.

1937 births
1990 deaths
Sulaymani Bohras
Indian Ismailis
Indian expatriates in Bahrain
Indian expatriates in the United Kingdom
Artists from Karachi
Artists from Mumbai
Alumni of Central Saint Martins
Academic staff of Maharaja Sayajirao University of Baroda
20th-century Indian women artists
Women artists from Maharashtra